Diego Seoane Pérez (born 26 April 1988) is a Spanish professional footballer who plays as a right-back for Pontevedra CF.

Club career
Born in Ourense, Galicia, Seoane graduated from local Deportivo de La Coruña's youth academy, and made his senior debut while on loan to lowly SD Ciudad de Santiago in the 2007–08 season, in Tercera División. In the summer of 2008 he returned to Dépor, being immediately assigned to the reserves in Segunda División B.

Seoane appeared in his first match as a professional on 27 January 2010, playing the full 90 minutes of a 1–0 away win against Sevilla FC in the quarter-finals of the Copa del Rey. He made his La Liga debut on 20 March, in a 0–2 home loss to Real Valladolid.

On 19 June 2010, Seoane signed a three-year professional contract with Deportivo. He continued to appear regularly for the B team, however.

Seoane agreed to an extension on 29 January 2013, and was immediately loaned to Segunda División side Córdoba CF. He started in 11 of his league appearances during his spell in Andalusia.

Having been the only member of the squad to not play in a competitive fixture during the campaign, Seoane was loaned to neighbouring CD Lugo of the second tier on 14 January 2015. He cut ties with the former club on 20 July, and moved to SD Ponferradina a day later.

Personal life
Seoane's father, Paco, was also a footballer. He spent most of his career in the lower leagues.

Career statistics

Club

References

External links
Deportivo official profile 

1988 births
Living people
Spanish footballers
Footballers from Ourense
Association football defenders
La Liga players
Segunda División players
Segunda División B players
Tercera División players
Segunda Federación players
Deportivo Fabril players
Deportivo de La Coruña players
Córdoba CF players
CD Lugo players
SD Ponferradina players
Racing de Ferrol footballers
Pontevedra CF footballers
Moldovan Super Liga players
FC Dacia Chișinău players
Spanish expatriate footballers
Expatriate footballers in Moldova
Spanish expatriate sportspeople in Moldova